James "Jim" Linder (born 1954) is an American author, academic and businessperson, as well as an authority on university research commercialization. He serves as chief executive officer (CEO) of Nebraska Medicine, and most recently was president of the University Technology Development Corporation and chief strategist for the University of Nebraska system. He is also a professor of pathology and microbiology at the University of Nebraska Medical Center.

Early life and education
A native to Omaha, Linder earned his B.S. degree in biochemistry and microbiology from Iowa State University in 1976, and his M.D. degree, with distinction, from the University of Nebraska Medical Center (UNMC) in 1980. He completed his residency training in pathology at Duke University Medical Center and UNMC.

Academic activities
Linder served as interim president of the University of Nebraska system from May 2014 until April 2015. He has served on the UNMC faculty since 1983 when he joined the Pathology and Microbiology department. In 1986 he was named associate professor and in 1989 was named professor. He has held numerous administrative positions at UNMC, including vice chairman of Pathology and Microbiology, director of Surgical Pathology, director of Cytopathology, associate dean for Academic Affairs and interim dean of Medicine. He was associate vice chancellor for Research from 2005-2009, and was responsible for developing clinical research and intellectual property programs at UNMC.  He also served as visiting professor at the Peter Kiewit Institute. In January 2007, UNMC's intellectual property office merged with UNeMed, and Linder was appointed president of the expanded operation.

He is a former president of the American Society for Clinical Pathology. 
He is a frequent guest lecturer, and has written five textbooks and more than 130 professional articles.  He serves on several editorial boards, including the American Journal of Clinical Pathology and Modern Pathology.  He is a member and has served in leadership positions with many medical organizations, and active in the development of the Interactive Center of the U.S.-Canadian division of the International Academy of Pathology.

He holds numerous patents, and his academic interests include the application of technology in medical diagnostics, including immunochemistry, molecular diagnostics, computer-aided instruction, digital imaging in pathology, and the use of automated techniques in cytopathology and hematology.

Business activities
From 1995 to 2007 he served as medical director of Cytyc Corporation, a company based in Marlborough, Mass. dedicated to women's health. A main area of interest was improving Pap testing.

From 2009-13, he was founding chief medical officer for Constitution Medical Investors. The company was later acquired by the Roche Diagnostics, in 2013, and Linder stayed on, until 2015, and there developed a hematology analyzer. where he served as a Chief Medical Officer. Linder and his wife, Karen Linder, are founders and managing directors of Linseed Capital, LLC, which invests in early-stage companies.

He previously chaired the board of Nobl Health, a company which provides nursing-management software, and also chaired the scientific advisory board of Streck Corporation, a manufacturer of clinical laboratory products. He is board member of Nebraska Medicine, the health system for the University of Nebraska Medical Center.

Awards and honors
Linder has been accorded several professional honors and awards. In 2015, recognizing accomplishments in laboratory medicine and technology transfer, he was inducted as a fellow of the National Academy of Inventors. In 2014 he and Karen Linder received the Entrepreneurial Leadership Award. In 2013 Linseed Capital was recognized as Investor of the Year by the Silicon Prairie News. In 2005, he was presented with the American Society of Clinical Pathologists' "Israel Davidsohn Award for Distinguished Service." He received the Iowa State University Distinguished Alumni Award, in 2020, and he and Karen Linder were inducted into the Omaha Business Hall of Fame.

Boards and community service
From 1999-2001, he served on the board of directors of the Omaha Children's Museum. He has served as chairman of the board of KANEKO, an organization devoted to fostering creativity, and serves as chair of the Kaneko Creative Council. He was a regional board member of the Pipeline Entrepreneurship Program.

Personal and family
Linder is married to Karen Linder SCT(ASCP), president of Tethon 3D and author of The Women of Berkshire Hathaway. He has six children.

References

Living people
University of Nebraska Medical Center alumni
Iowa State University alumni
American pathologists
University of Nebraska Medical Center faculty
1954 births
Presidents of the University of Nebraska System